J. A. Smith may refer to:

John Alexander Smith (1863–1939), Idealist philosopher
J. Albert Smith, 19th century footballer
J. Andre Smith  (1880–1959), American war artist
Justus Albert Smith (1896–1971), politician in Ontario, Canada

See also
James A. Smith (disambiguation)
John A. Smith (disambiguation)